Taghmon or Taughmon is a place name and may refer to:

Places
Ireland

Taghmon, a village in County Wexford
Taghmon (civil parish),  a civil parish of the barony of Corkaree, County Westmeath
Taghmon (civil parish, County Wexford), a civil parish spanning the baronies of Bargy and Shelmaliere West, County Wexford
Taghmon (townland, County Westmeath), a townland in Taghmon civil parish, barony of Corkaree

See also
Crookedwood, a small village in County Westmeath, historically called Taghmon after the townland it occupies
Fintán of Taghmon
Taughmonagh